Nananthus is a genus of flowering plants belonging to the family Aizoaceae.

Its native range is Southern Africa.

Species
Species:

Nananthus aloides 
Nananthus gerstneri 
Nananthus margaritifer 
Nananthus pallens 
Nananthus pole-evansii 
Nananthus vittatus

References

Aizoaceae
Aizoaceae genera
Taxa named by N. E. Brown